JazzTimes is an American magazine devoted to jazz.  Published 10 times a year, it was founded in Washington, D.C. in 1970 by Ira Sabin as the newsletter Radio Free Jazz to complement his record store.

Coverage 
After a decade of growth in subscriptions, deepening of writer pools, and internationalization, Radio Free Jazz expanded its focus and, at the suggestion of jazz critic Leonard Feather, changed its name to JazzTimes in 1980.

Sabin's Glenn joined the magazine staff in 1984. In 1990, JazzTimes incorporated exclusive cover photography and higher quality art and graphic design. The magazine reviews audio and video releases concerts, instruments, music supplies, and books. It also includes a guide to musicians, events, record labels, and music schools.

David Fricke, whose writing credits include Rolling Stone, Melody Maker and Mojo, also contributes to the magazine.

Web traffic 
JazzTimes.com was redesigned in 2019. Among its most popular stories are the JazzTimes10, which look at the "Top 10" of a specific categories of jazz, from Christmas songs to tunes from the Loft Jazz era. Also popular are its annual critics and readers polls of the top artists, albums and songs in jazz. JazzTimes.com's most successful month was in February 2015, when it registered more than half a million pageviews. In 2019, it registered 3,736,397 pageviews with 65% of its traffic direct and a quarter of it from organic search.

Ownership and management
Guthrie Inc. was the founding company of the magazine and suspended JazzTimes in June 2009. Later that year, JazzTimes was acquired by Madavor Media, LLC, a Delaware company based in Quincy, Massachusetts (Jeffrey C. Wolk, Chairman and CEO; born 1966).

Madavor Media relaunched the magazine the same year. Lee C. Mergner — who was Associate Publisher of JazzTimes from as early as 1994 till sometime after September 1999 — became publisher as early as 2001. Glenn D. Sabin (born 1963), one of Ira's sons, was the publisher when the magazine was sold in 2009, and Jeffrey H. Sabin (born 1961), Ira's other son, was general manager at the time. Mac Randall was named editor in chief in 2018 after longtime editor Evan Haga stepped down from his role. Mergner remains a part-time employee for JazzTimes.

On February 15, 2023 Madavor Media was acquired by The BeBop Channel Corporation, a public company under the ticker symbol BBOP and headed up by jazz musician and interim CEO Gregory Charles Royal.

References

External links 
 

Jazz magazines
Magazines established in 1970
Magazines published in Massachusetts
Magazines published in Washington, D.C.
Music magazines published in the United States
Ten times annually magazines